Fermín or Fermin may refer to:
 Fermin, Spanish saint
 Fermin (name), Spanish name and surname
 Fermin IV, Mexican rapper and pastor

See also

 San Fermín